Schiøtz tonometer is an indentation tonometer, used to measure the intraocular pressure (IOP) by measuring the depth produced on the surface of the cornea by a load of a known weight. The indentation of corneal surface is related to the IOP.

Parts
The Schiotz tonometer consists of a curved footplate which is placed on the cornea of a supine patient. A weighted plunger attached to the footplate sinks into the cornea. A scale then gives a reading depending on how much the plunger sinks into the cornea, and a conversion table converts the scale reading into IOP measured in mmHg.

Footplates have to be cool, dry and sterilized before use.

Eponym
It was invented by the Norwegian ophthalmologist Hjalmar August Schiøtz, who presented it to the Norwegian Medical Society on 10 May 1905.

References

External links
 How to measure intraocular pressure: Schiötz tonometry

Medical equipment
Eye procedures
Ophthalmic equipment